Narendra Narayan Yadav is an Indian politician. He was elected to the Bihar Legislative Assembly from Alamnagar in the 2015 Bihar Legislative Assembly as a member of the Janata Dal (United). He is currently the Minister of Law and Minor water resources in the Bihar Cabinet under Nitish Kumar. He started career in politics from 1967 in his childhood, was also involved in JP Movement and has been an MLA from Alamnagar constituency since 1995.

References

People from Madhepura district
Bihar MLAs 2015–2020
1951 births
Living people
State cabinet ministers of Bihar
Bihar MLAs 2020–2025
Bihar MLAs 1995–2000
Bihar MLAs 2000–2005
Bihar MLAs 2005–2010